Amersham is an abandoned village in the Saint Anthony Parish on the island of Montserrat. The village, located north of the former neighbouring village of Kinsale, had a small population before the volcano erupted in 1995. Google Satellite shows the village is now unrecognizable, due to it being buried beneath hardened lava flows and the encroaching forest. There are only the exposed top portions of two buildings still standing which sit at the southern entrance of the village.

Amersham Estate
The village used to have an estate, called Amersham Estate.

References

Former populated places in Montserrat